The FTBOA Florida Sire Stakes Susan's Girl division is a thoroughbred horse race run annually at Gulfstream Park, in Hallandale Beach, Florida for two-year-old fillies sired by FTBOA registered stallions at a distance of seven furlongs on dirt. It is part of the eleven-race Florida Thoroughbred Breeders' & Owners' Association (FTBOA) Florida Sire series of which seven races are hosted by Gulfstream Park and four by Tampa Bay Downs.

History
Inaugurated at Calder Race Course in 1982, the race was part of Calder's Florida Stallion Stakes series through 2013 after which Calder's racing operations were leased to the Stronach Group, operators of Gulfstream Park.

Named in honor of U.S. Racing Hall of Fame inductee Susan's Girl, it is the second of the three Gulfstream Park FBTOA races exclusively for this specific age and gender group of registered Florida-breds who are from a Florida Sire Stakes eligible stallion. Run between the beginning of August and the end of September, the Susan's Girl Stakes follows the Desert Vixen Stakes at 6 furlongs and precedes the My Dear Girl Stakes at  1 1/16 miles (8.5 furlongs).

Records
Speed record at Gulfstream Park:
 At 7 furlongs : 1:24.91 by Cajun Delta Dawn in 2016

Speed record at Calder:
 At 7 furlongs : 1:23.49 by Silk Concorde in 2000

Most wins by a jockey:
 3 – Manoel Cruz (2002, 2005, 2006)
 3 – Manuel Aguilar (2004, 2007, 2008)

Most wins by a trainer:
 2 – Marvin Moncrief (1982, 1983)
 2 – David A. Vivian (1995, 2004)
 2 – Edward Plesa Jr. (1998, 2006)
 2 – Kathleen O'Connell (2002, 2013)
 2 – Stanley I. Gold (2005, 2010)

Most wins by an owner:
 2 – Dan R. Lasater (1982, 1983)
 2 – Gilbert G. Campbell (2002, 2013)

Winners
Gulfstream Park 2017–2018 Media Guide and race history:

References

Restricted stakes races in the United States
Gulfstream Park
Calder Race Course
Horse races in Florida
Flat horse races for two-year-old fillies
Recurring sporting events established in 1982
1982 establishments in Florida